The Oregon Land Conservation and Development Act of 1973, formally Oregon Senate Bills 100 and 101 of 1973 (SB 100 and SB 101), were pieces of landmark legislation passed by the Oregon State Senate in 1973 and later signed into law. It created a framework for land use planning across the state, requiring every city and county to develop a comprehensive plan for land use.

SB 100 expanded on Senate Bill 10 (SB 10) of 1969. This legislation created the Oregon Land Conservation and Development Commission (LCDC), which expanded on the statewide planning goals of SB 10. It also established the Oregon Department of Land Conservation and Development.

Planning goals 
By 1976, the planning goals laid out by the act numbered 19:
 Citizen Involvement
 Land Use Planning
 Agricultural Land
 Forest Lands
 Open Spaces, Scenic and Historic Areas, and Natural Resources
 Air, Water, and Land Resources Quality
 Areas Subject to Natural Disaster and Hazards
 Recreational Needs
 Economy of the State
 Housing
 Public Facilities and Services
 Transportation
 Energy Conservation
 Urbanization
 Willamette River Greenway
 Estuarine Resources
 Coastal Shorelands
 Beaches and Dunes
 Ocean Resources

Attempts to repeal 
An attempt to repeal SB 100 was launched as early as 1976. In an editorial, the Eugene Register-Guard asserted its staff had attended many of the legislative hearings leading to the bills' passage, and that it was "too early to talk about a repeal of Senate Bill 100, when it [had] hardly a chance to work." The initiative petition succeeded in putting Measure 10 on the November ballot, but the measure was the first of many repeal attempts to fail in subsequent decades. The Central Lane County League of Women Voters published a booklet on land use planning that year.

In 2000, Measure 7 passed, but was later overturned by the Oregon Supreme Court; 2004's Measure 37 also passed, but its impacts were lessened with 2007's Measure 49.

See also 
 Land use in Oregon
 Hector Macpherson, Jr.
Wilbur Ternyik
 Tom McCall, Oregon governor intimately involved in the passage of these bills
 Willamette Valley
 Metro (Oregon regional government)

References

External links 
 Land use in Oregon overview

Politics of Oregon
Land use in Oregon
1970s in Oregon